Leith School of Art (LSA) is an independent art college in Edinburgh, Scotland, providing tertiary education in art and design.  LSA is located in the Leith area of Edinburgh, in the converted former Norwegian Seamen's Church, originally built by Scottish architect James Simpson and Danish architect Johan Schroder in 1868.

LSA was founded by Mark and Charlotte Cheverton. It was founded in 1988 or 1989 with the aim:

" ... to create a school with a vital artistic life emphasising both tradition and innovation, to produce work of distinctive quality and character."

LSA has always been based in the former Norwegian Seamen's Church in Leith.  Studios are set out on three levels in the main church building, with additional studio and lecture space in the former church hall at the rear of the main building. In 1999 a modern extension was built around three sides of the former church, adding further studio space, a small library and entrance hall.

See also 
List of further and higher education colleges in Scotland

References

External links 
Leith School of Art

Art schools in Scotland
Education in Edinburgh
Leith